The period of clipper ships lasted from the early 1840s to the early 1890s, and over time features such as the hull evolved from wooden to composite. At the 'crest of the clipper wave' year of 1852, there were 200 clippers rounding Cape Horn. The age of clippers ended when they were phased out in favor of more modern Iron-hulled sailing ships, which eventually gave way to steamships. In the late 20th century, ships based on the 19th century designs of historical ships began to be built. These are used today as training ships and to promote tourism rather than for cargo or trade. The following entries are organized by their year of launch and alphabetically within each year.

List criteria
Among other characteristics which define a clipper is that they were usually ships in the strictest sense of the word. That is, they were three-masted vessels (though rarely four-masted) and were fully square-rigged on all masts. Speedy contemporary vessels with other sail plans, such as barques, were also sometimes called clippers. Likewise, Baltimore clipper is a colloquial term most commonly applied to two-masted schooners and brigantines. The "Baltimore clipper" was actually invented before the appearance of clipper ships. On the other end of the timeline are iron-hulled sailing ships which differ from clipper ships. The only iron-hulled examples present on this list are labeled as clippers by reliable sources.

Historical clipper ships

The list is presented first by year of launch and then alphabetically within each year.

1840s

1850s

1860s

1870s - 1890s

Modern clipper ships
The following clipper ships were built in the late 20th and early 21st centuries, they were inspired by the historical Clipper era which peaked in the 1850s.

See also

ARM Cuauhtémoc (Mexico)
Clipper
Extreme clipper
Ocean liner
Bibliography of early American naval history
Bibliography of 18th-19th century Royal Naval history
Tall Ships' Races

Notes

References

 
Clippers